Lee Jae-yong (born March 21, 1963) is a South Korean actor. Best known as a character actor, Lee has played supporting roles in film and television, notably as a dogged ex-detective in Jang Joon-hwan's Save the Green Planet! (2003) and an embezzling Joseon politician in Detective K: Secret of the Virtuous Widow (2011).

Filmography

Film

Television series

Variety show

Awards and nominations

References

External links 
 
 
 

1963 births
Living people
South Korean male television actors
South Korean male film actors
People from Chuncheon